The 1987 Brabantse Pijl was the 27th edition of the Brabantse Pijl cycle race and was held on 29 March 1987. The race started in Sint-Genesius-Rode and finished in Alsemberg. The race was won by Edwig Van Hooydonck.

General classification

References

1987
Brabantse Pijl